Victor Merrick Ripley (May 30, 1906 – March 26, 1962) was a Canadian hockey centerman who played seven seasons in the National Hockey League for the Chicago Black Hawks, Boston Bruins, New York Rangers, and St. Louis Eagles. He also played several years in various minor leagues during his career, which lasted from 1925 to 1944. Ripley was later a golf pro at the Desert Inn Country Club in Las Vegas. He was born in Elgin, Ontario, but grew up in Calgary, Alberta. Ripley died of a heart attack on March 26, 1962.

Ripley scored the 1,000th regular-season goal in Boston Bruins' history. It was Boston's lone goal in a 4-1 loss to the Toronto Maple Leafs at Boston Garden on December 12, 1933. It was the same game in which Toronto's Ace Bailey suffered a horrific career-ending head injury.

Career statistics

Regular season and playoffs

References

External links

1906 births
1963 deaths
Boston Bruins players
Canadian ice hockey left wingers
Chicago Blackhawks players
Cleveland Barons (1937–1973) players
Cleveland Falcons players
Ice hockey people from Ontario
Minneapolis Millers (AHA) players
New Haven Eagles players
New York Rangers players
People from Leeds and Grenville United Counties
Portland Buckaroos players
Seattle Seahawks (ice hockey) players
Spokane Clippers players
Ice hockey people from Calgary
St. Louis Eagles players
Canadian expatriate ice hockey players in the United States